Donald J. Jenkins (born April 18, 1948) is a former United States Army soldier and a recipient of the United States military's highest decoration, the Medal of Honor, for his actions in the Vietnam War.

Military career
Jenkins joined the United States Army from Nashville, Tennessee, and by January 6, 1969, was serving as a private first class in Alpha Company, 2d Battalion, 39th Infantry Regiment, 9th Infantry Division. During a firefight on that day, in Kien Phong Province, Republic of Vietnam, Jenkins repeatedly exposed himself to hostile fire to engage the enemy, resupply his ammunition, and obtain new weapons. Despite being wounded himself, he made several trips through intense fire to rescue other wounded soldiers. For his actions during the battle Jenkins was promoted to staff sergeant and awarded the Medal of Honor in March 1971.

Medal of Honor citation
Staff Sergeant Jenkins official Medal of Honor citation reads:

See also

List of Medal of Honor recipients for the Vietnam War

References

1948 births
Living people
People from Butler County, Kentucky
United States Army personnel of the Vietnam War
United States Army Medal of Honor recipients
United States Army soldiers
Vietnam War recipients of the Medal of Honor